Guy Malherbe (born April 9, 1946) is a member of the National Assembly of France.  He represents the Essonne department, and is a member of the Union for a Popular Movement.

References

1946 births
Living people
Politicians from Montpellier
Rally for the Republic politicians
Union for a Popular Movement politicians
The Republicans (France) politicians
Deputies of the 13th National Assembly of the French Fifth Republic
Mayors of places in Île-de-France